"Diamonds and Guns" is the debut single by American punk rock/hip hop band Transplants, released on October 15, 2002 as the lead single from their eponymous debut studio album. It was recorded on Tim's Basement in Los Angeles, California, produced by Tim Armstrong and Dave Carlock, and released via Hellcat Records. Its A-side track, "Diamonds And Guns", was written and performed by the Transplants (Robert "Skinhead Rob" Aston, Tim Armstrong, Travis Barker) and Jason "Son Doobie" Vasquez of Funkdoobiest. The single peaked at #19 on the US Alternative Songs (Billboard) and #27 on the UK Singles Chart. All four performers starred in the music video of "Diamonds And Guns".

The instrumental version of "Diamonds and Guns" is played as background music in older Garnier Fructis commercials. The song is edited minorly, toning down the guitar distortion. The song is also used in the series Smallville in the second-season episode 'Visitor'. This song was also featured in an episode of the short-lived series Fastlane. Also included in Bulletproof Monk when the character Kar is introduced. The B-side, "Tall Cans In the Air," was also used in the film.

Track listing 
adapted from Discogs
Note
†Music video for "Diamonds and Guns" also featured in some versions of the single.

Personnel

"Diamonds & Guns"
 Tim Armstrong - vocals, guitar, bass, loops, lyrics, mixing, producer
 Rob "Skinhead Rob" Aston - vocals, lyrics, scratches
 Travis Barker - drums
 Jason "Son Doobie" Vasquez - vocals, lyrics
 Dave Carlock - backing vocals, piano, mixing, producer
 Gene Grimaldi - mastering

"Tall Cans in the Air"
 Tim Armstrong - vocals, guitar, loops, lyrics, mixing, producer
 Rob "Skinhead Rob" Aston - vocals, lyrics
 Travis Barker - drums
 Dave Carlock - synthesizer, mixing, producer
 Brody Dalle - backing vocals
 Matt Freeman - bass
 Victor Ruggiero - Hammond B-3 organ
 Gene Grimaldi - mastering

Charts

References

2002 songs
2002 debut singles
Transplants (band) songs
Songs written by Tim Armstrong
Songs written by Travis Barker
Hellcat Records singles